Water from the Wells of Home is the 75th album by American country singer Johnny Cash, released on Mercury Records in 1988 (see 1988 in music). It features several collaborations with other artists, including "New Moon Over Jamaica" with Paul McCartney. Other guests include Waylon Jennings, Hank Williams Jr., Glen Campbell, Emmylou Harris and family members Rosanne Cash, John Carter Cash, June Carter Cash and members of the Carter Family. "Call Me the Breeze" is a J. J. Cale song that had been previously performed by Lynyrd Skynyrd. "Ballad of a Teenage Queen" is a new recording of a song that had appeared on Cash's Sun era album Sings the Songs That Made Him Famous. The album did not fare well on the charts, peaking at No. 48; the two singles, "Ballad of a Teenage Queen" and "That Old Wheel", reached No. 45 and No. 21, respectively.  A 2003 re-release of the album contained a bonus track, consisting of Johnny Cash discussing various songs on the album.

Track listing

Personnel

 Johnny Cash - vocals, rhythm guitar
 Glen Campbell - vocals
 John Carter Cash - vocals
 Emmylou Harris - vocals, rhythm guitar
 Waylon Jennings - vocals
 Paul McCartney - vocals, bass
 Hank Williams Jr. - vocals
 Roy Acuff - vocals
 Carlene Carter - vocals
 Rosanne Cash - vocals
 Don Everly - vocals
 Phil Everly - vocals
 Linda McCartney - vocals
 Anita Carter - vocals
 Jessi Colter - vocals
 June Carter Cash - vocals
 Tom T. Hall - harmony vocals
 Al Casey - guitar
 Marty Stuart - guitar, mandolin
 Mark Howard - guitar, mandolin, assistant musical director
 Jack Clement - rhythm guitar, ukulele
 Hamish Stuart - guitar
 Roy M. "Junior" Huskey - bass
 Charles Cochran - piano, keyboards
 Cindy Reynolds Wyatt - harp
 Ralph Mooney - pedal steel
 John Hartford - banjo
 Lloyd Green - dobro, pedal steel
 Joey Miskulin - piano, accordion, vocals, musical director
 Bobby Wood - piano, keyboards
 Kenny Malone - drums, percussion
 Chris Whitten - drums
 W. S. Holland - drums
 Jim Dant - drums
 Ace Cannon - saxophone
 Traci Werbel - coordination

Charts
Album - Billboard (United States)

Singles - Billboard (United States)

External links
 Luma Electronic's Johnny Cash discography listing

Johnny Cash albums
1988 albums
Albums produced by Jack Clement
Mercury Nashville albums